Bellator 295: Stots vs. Mix is a mixed martial arts event produced by Bellator MMA  that will take place on April 22, 2023, at the Neal S. Blaisdell Arena in Honolulu, Hawaii, United States.

Background 
An interim Bellator Bantamweight World Championship bout and the final of the $1 million dollar Bellator Bantamweight World Grand Prix Tournament between interim champion Raufeon Stots and former title challenger Patchy Mix is expected to headline the event.

A women's flyweight bout between former Bellator Women's Flyweight Champion Ilima-Lei Macfarlane and Kana Watanabe is expected to the co-main event.

Fight card

See also 

 2023 in Bellator MMA
 List of Bellator MMA events
 List of current Bellator fighters
 Bellator MMA Rankings

References 

Sports competitions in Honolulu
Bellator MMA events
2023 in mixed martial arts
April 2023 sports events in the United States
2023 in sports in Hawaii
Mixed martial arts in Hawaii
Sports competitions in Hawaii
Scheduled mixed martial arts events